Lorenzo Giustino was the defending champion but lost in the first round to Timofey Skatov.

Zizou Bergs won the title after defeating Skatov 4–6, 6–3, 6–2 in the final.

Seeds

Draw

Finals

Top half

Bottom half

References

External links
Main draw
Qualifying draw

Almaty Challenger - 1